Lavinia Fontana (August 24, 1552 – August 11, 1614) was a Bolognese Mannerist painter active in Bologna and Rome. She is best known for her successful portraiture, but also worked in the genres of mythology and religious painting. She was trained by her father Prospero Fontana who was a teacher at the School of Bologna. She is regarded as the first female career artist in Western Europe as she relied on commissions for her income. Her family relied on her career as a painter, and her husband served as her agent and raised their 11 children. She was perhaps the first woman artist to paint female nudes, but this is a topic of controversy among art historians.

Biography
Lavinia Fontana was born in Bologna in 1552 to Prospero Fontana and Antonia de' Bonardis. She was baptized on August 24, 1552 at the cathedral of San Pietro. Her elder sister Emilia died in 1568 when Lavinia was sixteen. Prospero was a prominent painter of the School of Bologna at the time and served as her teacher. Caroline P. Murphy suspects that financial issues may have prompted Prospero to train Lavinia as a painter. Being born as the daughter of a painter allowed her to become an artist in a time where female artists were not widely accepted. Fontana married Gian Paolo Zappi. Instead of offering a dowry as would have been widely accepted in this time Fontana painted to earn an income.

Her earliest known work, Child of the Monkey, was painted in 1575 at the age of 23. Though this work is now lost, another early painting, Christ with the Symbols of the Passion, painted in 1576, is now in the El Paso Museum of Art. Bolognese society at large was supportive of Fontana's artistic career, providing opportunities and connections that were not available to women in other locales. She began her commercial practice by painting small devotional paintings on copper, which had popular appeal as papal and diplomatic gifts, given the value and lustre of the metal. In the 1580s, she was known as a portraitist of Bolognese noblewomen who competed for her services. The high demand for portraits painted by Fontana was reflected in the large sums of money she earned during this period. Her relationships with female clients were often unusually warm; multiple women who sat for portraits, such as the Duchess of Sora Constanza Sforza Boncompagni, later served as namesakes or godmothers for Fontana's children. In addition to portraits, she later created large-scale paintings with religious and mythological themes which sometimes included female nudes.

Fontana married Gian Paolo Zappi (alternate spellings include Giovan and Fappi) in June 1577. The couple moved into Prospero's house in Bologna and Lavinia painted professionally, adding Zappi to her signature. She gave birth to 11 children, though only 3 outlived her: Flaminio, Orazio, and Prospero. Zappi took care of the household and served as an agent and painting assistant to his wife, including painting minor elements of paintings such as draperies. Fontana attended classes at the University of Bologna, and was listed as one of the city's 'Donne addottrinate' (women with doctorates) in 1580.

Roman period (1603-14) 
Fontana and her family moved to Rome in 1604 at the invitation of Pope Clement VIII. She gained the patronage of the Buoncompagni, of which Pope Gregory XIII was a member. She was subsequently appointed as Portraitist in Ordinary at the Vatican. Lavinia thrived in Rome as she had in Bologna and Pope Paul V himself was among her sitters. She was the recipient of numerous honors, including a bronze portrait medallion cast in 1611 by sculptor and architect Felice Antonio Casoni. According to Jean Owens Schaefer, the reverse side of the medal depicts Pittura, an allegorical figure representing painting. He also posits that this is the first visual rendition of Cesare Ripa's 1603 description of Pittura.

She was elected into the Accademia di San Luca of Rome. She died in the city of Rome on August 11, 1614 and was subsequently buried at Santa Maria sopra Minerva.

Legacy 
The Self-Portrait at the Clavichord with a Servant is considered to be her masterpiece. It was painted as a betrothal gift to the Zappi family as evidenced by Fontana describing herself as a virgin in the signature and stating that she painted while looking at herself in a mirror as a testament to the accuracy of the depiction. There are over 100 works that are documented, but only 32 signed and dated works are known today. There are 25 more that can be attributed to her, making hers the largest oeuvre for any female artist prior to 1700. Some of her portraits were once wrongly attributed to her contemporary Guido Reni.

Lavinia's mythology paintings which feature nude figures are being increasingly studied by art historians. Roman gods such as Minerva, Mars, and Venus are depicted in various forms of undress in these paintings. There is little or no basis for other contemporary women artists depicting nude figures in such a way. It has been said that Fontana's work with mythology painting represents possibly the first female artist involvement in the genre.     

Lavinia is immortalized as the subject of Portrait of a Woman (1595) by Paolo Veronese. She was the only woman artist featured in Giulio Mancini's Considerazioni sulla pittura (Considerations on Painting). The naturalism of her paintings is highly praised and the beauty of her paintings is linked to her own physical attractiveness.

Fontana influenced Alberto de' Rossi and Alessandro Tiarini. Aurelio Bonelli may have studied under her. She was a very successful artist who was well commissioned and was able to financially profit from her art. She is a rare example of a woman able to obtain such high levels of success in art during the Renaissance period. Her close attention to detail displayed the wealth of the sitter, and this is what made her so popular among the rich.

Artistry

Artistic influences 
Lavinia's youthful style resembled that of her father, Prospero. As a student of Ludovico Carracci, she gradually adopted the Carracciesque style, with strong quasi-Venetian coloring.

Sofonisba Anguissola, Caterina Vigri, and Properzia de' Rossi may have influenced Fontana's artistic career.

The Counter-Reformation and the Council of Trent's recommendations for religious art defined Fontana's treatment of subjects and themes in her paintings (see Rocco, Devout Hand for more on this topic). Excellent status as a daughter, wife, and mother was a prerequisite to her career due to the moral standards of the day. Demand for portraits of family and children rose due to the Roman Catholic Church's emphasis on family values.

Style 
The influence of Mannerism is noticeable in Fontana's close attention to detail in her paintings and the significance of the materials surrounding the subject. Fontana's self-portraiture strikes a balance between presenting the artist as a distinguished lady and as a professional artist. This depiction of two coexisting roles was common for sixteenth-century women artists.

Controversy

Nudity 
	

Among art historians, there is a controversy over Fontana's depiction of the nude female, and male form in her paintings. Liana De Girolami Cheney argues that the naturalism of the figures may indicate that Fontana used live nude models. Caroline P. Murphy argues that while body parts are well rendered, the figures as a whole are disproportionate, similar to Prospero's rendering of human anatomy. Additionally, Murphy points out that during Lavinia's lifetime, it was socially unacceptable for women to be exposed to nudity; if it was discovered that she used live nude models, her reputation would be tarnished. She instead suggests that like Sofonisba Anguissola, Fontana had family members model for her. Further, Linda Nochlin explains that the art academy barred women from viewing any nude body, despite this being a crucial part of training.

Major works
 Mystic marriage of St Catherine, c. 1575 – National Gallery of Victoria, Melbourne
 Self-Portrait with the Spinet Accompanied by a Handmaiden, 1577 – Accademia Nazionale di San Luca, Rome
 Self-Portrait with Palette and Brushes, 1579
 Portrait of a Noblewoman, c. 1580 – National Museum of Women in the Arts, Washington, D.C.
 Portrait of a Couple, 1580–1585 – Cleveland Museum of Art, Cleveland 
 The Dead Christ with Symbols, 1581 – Cornell Fine Arts Museum, Winter Park, Florida
 Newborn Baby in a Crib c. 1583 - Pinacoteca Nazionale di Bologna
 Portrait of the Gozzadini Family, 1584 – Pinacoteca Nazionale di Bologna
 Portrait of Gerolamo Mercuriale, c. 1587–1590 – Walters Art Museum, Baltimore
 Holy Family, 1589 – El Escorial, Outside Madrid
 Portrait of a Lady with Lap Dog, c. 1595 – Walters Art Museum, Baltimore
 Portrait of Constanza Alidosi, c. 1595 - National Museum of Women in the Arts, Washington, D.C. 
 The Visit of the Queen of Sheba to King Solomon, 1599, – National Gallery of Ireland, Dublin
 Birth of Virgin – Santissima Trinità, Bologna
 Consecration to the Virgin – Musee des Beaux-Arts, Marseilles, originally the Gnetti Chapel, Santa Maria dei Servi, Bologna
 Jesus among the Doctors – Part of the Mysteries of the Rosary in the Rosary chapel in the Basilica of San Domenico, Bologna 
 Minerva Dressing, 1613  – Galleria Borghese, Rome Mars and Venus, c. 1600-1610  – Fundación Casa de Alba, Madrid

See also 

 Women Artists
 Invisible Women: Forgotten Artists of Florence
 Sofonisba Anguissola
 List of Italian women artists
 Italian Renaissance painting

Notes

References
 
 Cheney, Liana (Spring-Summer 1984). "Lavinia Fontana, Boston 'Holy Family'". Woman's Art Journal. 5 (1).
 
 
 
 
 
 
 Murphy, Caroline P. (1996). "Lavinia Fontana and 'Le Dame della Citta': understanding female artistic patronage in late sixteenth-century Bologna." Renaissance Studies. 10 (2). pp. 190–208. JSTOR.
 Murphy, Caroline P. (1997). "Lavinia Fontana". Dictionary of Women Artists. Vol 1. Delia Gaze, ed. Chicago: Fitzroy Dearborn. pp. 534–7. .
 
 
Rocco, Patricia. The Devout Hand: Women, Virtue, and Visual Culture in Early Modern Italy. McGill-Queens University Press, 2017

Attribution

Further reading

External links 
 
 Orazio and Artemisia Gentileschi, a fully digitized exhibition catalog from The Metropolitan Museum of Art Libraries, which contains material on Lavinia Fontana (see index)

1552 births
1614 deaths
Italian portrait painters
16th-century Italian painters
17th-century Italian painters
Italian women painters
Italian Renaissance painters
Painters from Bologna
17th-century Italian women artists
16th-century Italian women artists
Catholic painters
Female Catholic artists